Khandsa is a village in Gurgaon mandal in Gurgaon District, Haryana State, India. It has a population of about 9959 persons living in some 1912 households. It lies on the NH-8 highway. It is near New Delhi, India.

Geography
Nearby villages are Naharpur Roopa (2.333 km), Hari Nagar (Duma) (2.535 km), Shahpur-Jat (2.626 km), Kadipur (2.711 km), Kherki Daula (3.112 km), Rampura Safedar Nagar (3.346 km).

Administration
Khandsa Pin Code is 122004.

Eklavya temple
There is an Eklavya temple in honour of Eklavya in Khandsa.As in Mahabharata and As per folklore, this is the only temple of Eklavya and it is the place where Eklavya cut his thumb and offered to guru Drona.

References

Villages in Gurgaon district